The New Haven County Cutters were an independent baseball team based in New Haven, Connecticut. From 2004 through 2007, it played in the Canadian-American Association of Professional Baseball (the "Can-Am League," formerly known as the Northeast League in 2004), an independent league that is not affiliated with Major League Baseball or with the Minor League Baseball organization.

Franchise history

Massachusetts Mad Dogs

Originally based in Lynn, Massachusetts, the Massachusetts Mad Dogs were named during an event that included students from Lynn and nearby Nahant, Massachusetts. The Mad Dogs were members of three different independent baseball leagues. They began to play in 1996 as an expansion team in the North Atlantic League with former major league star George Scott as manager, and he would manage the team for all four years that the Mad Dogs played in the region. They dominated the NAL, going 56-21 and winning the pennant by 13 games, but fell 2-0 in the best-of-3 playoffs to the Catskill Cougars. The Mad Dogs drew the most fans in the league with 52,384.

When the NAL folded after the 1996 season, the Mad Dogs jumped to the Northeast League and went 45-37, tying for the second half northern lead (23-17) with the Albany-Colonie Diamond Dogs. Massachusetts lost in the playoffs 2 games to 1 to Albany. The first year in the Northeast League drew 72,681 fans, second to Albany's 72,985.

The Mad Dogs fell to 39-45 in 1998 and they were next to last in attendance, drawing only 47,123 fans. In 1999, the Northeast League merged into the Northern League to form the Northern League East Division. The club was 41-45 in a tight division.  They finished one game out in the first half; they tied for the last place in the second half but were just 4 games back. Attendance fell to last in the Northern League's Eastern Division with 38,528.  Following the 1999 season, the team suspended operations citing major issues with the team's home in Lynn, Fraser Field.

Berkshire Black Bears

After a three year hiatus, the franchise was resurrected, this time in Pittsfield, Massachusetts as the Berkshire Black Bears, playing at historic Wahconah Park.  Despite the change of location, the losing continued and the team drew minimal support from the area.  Following the 2003 season, the team moved again, this time to New Haven, Connecticut.  Owner Jonathan Fleisig attributed the move to criticism of the team from the Pittsfield civic leaders.

New Haven County Cutters

During their four seasons in New Haven, the Cutters had varying degrees of success. Their first season saw them leading the Northeast League South Division for most of the first half of their season, but the team severely faltered down the stretch of the first half and ended up losing the division to the eventual league champion New Jersey Jackals in a one-game playoff at Yale Field. The bad streak continued, and the Cutters fell to the last place in the division in the second half and cost first-year manager Jarvis Brown, a former Minnesota Twins prospect, his job.

In 2005, led by first-year manager Mike Church, The Cutters' fortunes started out badly in the first half with an 18-28 record. However, in the second half, they had a complete reversal of fortune and won their first half-season division championship, with a 28-18 record, and qualified for the Can-Am League playoffs. However, the Cutters' luck ran out in the first round of the playoffs, as they were eliminated 3 games to 1 by the eventual league champion Worcester Tornadoes.

In 2006, the Cutters kept pace with league-leading North Shore Spirit with the second-best overall record in the league.  The Cutters once again were defeated in the first round of the Can-Am League playoffs by the Brockton Rox three games to one.

On October 30, 2007, Cutters' President David Boyle, Chairman Jonathan Fleisig, and Vice Chairman Rick Handelman announced that the team would "not be playing baseball at Yale Field in 2008." The Cutters were joined by the North Shore Spirit in no longer being part of the Can-Am League in the 2008 season.

On November 9–10, 2007, the Cutters held a sale at Yale Field to sell-off any remaining Cutters merchandise to those interested in getting their piece of New Haven baseball history.

Notable alumni
Gavin Fingleson, Olympic baseball silver medal winner

See also 
Professional baseball in Connecticut

References

Canadian American Association of Professional Baseball
County Cutters
West Haven, Connecticut
Professional baseball teams in Connecticut
Sports clubs disestablished in 2007
Baseball teams in the New York metropolitan area
Defunct independent baseball league teams
Defunct baseball teams in Connecticut
Baseball teams established in 2004
Baseball teams disestablished in 2007
North Atlantic League teams